Hemmingwell is a medium sized, densely populated council estate in Wellingborough, Northamptonshire, England. The area had a population of 8,272 at the 2011 census. The estate is often known as 'Wellingborough's toughest estate'.

History 
The area that would become Hemmingwell was first used for farming and allotments, and was known as Hemmingwell Farm. However, in the late 60s and early 70s, the allotments were removed and construction of the estate begun. The estate was predominantly built to house London overspill population. The development was built adjacent to the estate known as 'The Pyghtle', which was built in the 1950s. Hemmingwell Road connects the two estates.

From the 1980s until the early 2000s, strong putrid fumes from Chettles pet food factory along Ditchford Lane would usually blow upwind into Wellingborough, particularly eastern Wellingborough and Hemmingwell. Chettles took control of the problem in the early 2000s due to numerous complaints.

From 2012–2014, the estate's garages and parking areas were redesigned to be more open to reducing crime. For example, walls were removed or replaced with fences and barricades, along with other general improvements around the estate.

Demographics 
Hemmingwell has a highly multi-cultural population with 81.5% of the population born in England, 2.4% born in India, 1.3% born in Scotland, 1.0% born in Kenya, 0.8% born in Zimbabwe, 0.6% born in Wales, 0.5% born in Ireland, 0.5% born in Bangladesh, 0.4% born in Jamaica and 0.4% born in South Africa, according to the 2011 Census.

Crime 
Hemmingwell has consistently held a high crime rate and is known for gang-related violence. The estate is also known for other offences, particularly arson. In 2017 however, Northamptonshire Police launched 'Operation Restore' in an effort to reduce arson on the estate.

Parks and recreation 
 Hemmingwell Skatepark
 Hemmingwell Basketball Court
 Guillemot Park and Play Area

Public transportation 
The area is well served by public transportation provided by Stagecoach's W2 bus, and the estate is close to Wellingborough railway station.

Politics 
Hemmingwell is part of the Rixon ward (formerly known as Hemmingwell ward), which is represented by Jon-Paul Carr (Conservative), Nasreen Imtiaz (Conservative) and William Inskip (Labour).
The ward forms part of the parliamentary constituency of Wellingborough and the MP is Peter Bone (Conservative).

References

External links 
 Borough Council of Wellingborough

Wellingborough